Bernadette Corporation is a New York City and Paris-based art and fashion collective founded in 1994. Core members include Bernadette van Huy, John Kelsey, and Antek Walzcak. Bernadette Corporation is known for its performance, fashion, and art which in varying ways emulates and disturbs corporations. Influences from fashion to film include Vivienne Westwood, Malcolm McLaren, and Jean-Luc Godard.  The group is often described in terms of the Situationist movement.

History
When Bernadette Corporation first formed, they were hired to organize parties at downtown nightclubs. They quickly began making fashion and took part in the world of 1990s underground fashion. In the 1990s, their clothes were published in Harper's Bazaar, Purple, Visionaire, Index Magazine, and Artforum. They take influences from the "three Bs"; Barthes, Bataille and Baudrillard.

In the late 1990s, Bernadette Corporation became more productive as a publishing, film, and video group, briefly publishing the magazine Made in USA, named after the Jean-Luc Godard film of the same name.

In 2001 Bernadette Corporation temporarily merged with Le Parti Imaginaire to make the film Get Rid of Yourself, which retains both fiction and documentary elements. The Bernadette Corporation's other films include; The B.C. Corporate Story, Hell Frozen Over, and Get Rid of Yourself.

Bernadette Van Huy
Bernadette van Huy is a New York-based artist and one of the founding members of Bernadette Corporation. She moved to Manhattan at the age of 23 at which point she began to organise parties in New York nightclubs. She is one of the two currently active members of the collective along with John Kelsey. In 1997 she worked as the costume designer for the Harmony Korine film Gummo.

Publications
 Made in USA magazine 
 Bernadette Corporation (Collective). 2004. Reena Spaulings. New York: Semiotext(e). 
 Vasiljevic, David. 2011. Bernadette Corporation: the complete poem. London: Koenig Books Ltd.

Exhibitions
The Gay Signs, Gaga, Los Angeles, May 2017
Bernadette Corporation: 2000 Wasted Years, Artists Space.
A Haven for the Soul, Galerie Neu, Berlin, Germany. November–December 2010
Peliculas, Perros Negros, Mexico City, late May - late July 2007
Multiplyplex, Künstlerhaus Stuttgart, March 2007
Bernadette Corporation, How To Cook A Wolf, Kunsthalle Zürich Parallel, January 2007
Be Corpse, Volksbühne Pavilion, Galerie Meerrettich, Berlin, November 2006
Bernadette Corporation - King Kong, Hamburg Kunstverein, January 2006
Bernadette Corporation, Witte de With, Rotterdam, November 2005
Cinéma des damnés / Tout doit disparaître, Galerie Yvon Lambert, Le Studio / Project Room, Paris, Sept. 2004
How to make 'life' fashionable? Galerie Meerrettich, Volksbühne Pavilion, Berlin, October 2003

External links

 Official website

Reena Spaulings: A Novel by Bernadette Corporation (includes .pdf download)

References

International artist groups and collectives
Arts organizations established in 2004